Dudley Selden (1794 – November 7, 1855 Paris, France) was an American lawyer and politician from New York. From 1833 to 1834, he served part of one term in the  U.S. House of Representatives.

Life

Family 
He was a son of Joseph Dudley Selden (1764–1837) and Ethelinda Colt (1771–1864). He married Mary Augusta Packard (1803–1868), and had a daughter Maria Louisa Selden who married William Rogers Morgan.

Early career 
Selden graduated from Union College, Schenectady, New York, in 1819. He studied law.
He was admitted to the bar and commenced the practice of his profession in New York City in 1831.

Political career 
He was a member of the New York State Assembly in 1831.

Congress 
Selden was elected as a Jacksonian to the 23rd United States Congress and served from March 4, 1833, to July 1, 1834, when he resigned.

Death and burial 
He died on November 7, 1855, in Paris, France and was buried at Green-Wood Cemetery in Brooklyn, New York.

Sources

 Selden Ancestry: A Family History, by Seophie Selden Rogers, Elizabeth Selden Lane, and Edwin Van Deusen Selden. Published Oil City, PA by E. Van D Selden.
Samuel Colt: Arms, Art, and Invention by Herbert G. Houze, Carolyn C. Cooper, Elizabeth Mankin Kornhauser (Yale University Press, 2006,  ; page 246) [gives birthyear 1794, but shows Joseph Dudley Selden in a place which suggests his marriage to another Ethelinda of the next generation]

External links

  (gives birthyear 1797)

1855 deaths
1794 births
American expatriates in France
Union College (New York) alumni
Burials at Green-Wood Cemetery
Members of the New York State Assembly
Jacksonian members of the United States House of Representatives from New York (state)
19th-century American politicians
Members of the United States House of Representatives from New York (state)